This is a list for episodes of the PBS children's television series, Shining Time Station.

Series overview

Episodes

Season 1 (1989) 
 Season 1 consists of 20 episodes.
Mr. Conductor: Ringo Starr

Christmas Special (1990) 
Mr. Conductor: Ringo Starr

Season 2 (1991) 
 Season 2 consists of 20 episodes.
 Jason Woliner and Nicole Leach reprise their Season 1 main roles for two episodes.
 Only two episodes this seasons features only one Thomas story as opposed to two, this would be common place in the following season.

Mr. Conductor: George Carlin

Season 3 (1993) 
 Didi Conn has a haircut only in this season.
 Starting with this season, Danielle Marcot was added to the opening credits.
 This season consisted of 25 episodes.
 This season mostly features episodes with one Thomas story each, only 6 episodes retain the two story format from the first two seasons.

Mr. Conductor: George Carlin

Family Specials (1995) 
Mr. Conductor: George Carlin

Mr. Conductor's Thomas Tales (1996) 
Mr. Conductor: George Carlin

References 

Lists of American children's television series episodes